Perrine, Florida was an unincorporated community in Miami-Dade County, Florida, United States,  about midway between Miami and Homestead. It is at  The community was named after Henry Perrine, who in 1839 had been granted a survey township of land in the area by the United States Congress in recognition of his service as United States Consul in Campeche, Mexico, and to support his plans to introduce new plants from tropical countries into cultivation in the United States.

While waiting to hear if Congress had approved his grant, Perrine took up residence with his family at Indian Key, Florida, in 1838. This location was considered safer than the southern Florida mainland, as the Second Seminole War was still in progress. On August 7, 1840, Indians attacked Indian Key. Several people were killed, including Perrine, but his family escaped.

History
Perrine's son, Henry Jr., and one of Perrine's business partners, Charles Howe, made various attempts to exploit the grant, with little success. Eventually homesteaders began to encroach on the grant, and in 1886 families that had started farms in the grant area formed a squatters union to fight eviction from their farms by the Perrine heirs. Two railroad companies, including the Florida East Coast Railway, joined with the Perrine heirs, and the courts eventually awarded  to the squatters,  to the Perrine family, and  each to the railroad companies (part of the original grant had been sold earlier).

The community that became known as Perrine started as a railroad camp during the construction of the Florida East Coast Railway extension from Miami to Homestead. The first school in Perrine was opened in 1909. The community developed in a segregated fashion, with the area to the east of the railroad all white and the area to the west of the railroad all black. Perrine incorporated as a city in 1948. A black mayor was elected a year later. The all-white city council and the first mayor requested the Florida Legislature to dissolve the city, and it did.

Perrine was a Census-designated place (CDP) in the 1990 U.S. Census, with a counted population of 15,576. In the 2000 Census, Perrine was divided into two CDPs: East Perrine and West Perrine. East Perrine, which had a population of 7,079 in 2000, became part of the incorporated municipality of Palmetto Bay in 2002. West Perrine had a population of 8,600 in 2000, and 9,460 in 2010.

Population history from the U.S. Census Bureau
1950: 2,859
1960: 6,424
1970: 10,257
1980: 16,129
1990: 15,576

Climate
Perrine has a tropical monsoon climate (Am), according to the Köppen climate classification.

Education
Miami-Dade County Public Schools operates area public schools.

The Roman Catholic Archdiocese of Miami operates area Catholic schools. Our Lady of the Holy Rosary-St. Richard School is in Cutler Bay, It was formerly known as Our Lady of the Holy Rosary, and previously it was in the Cutler Ridge CDP but had a Perrine postal address.

References

External links
 1990 U.S. Census Map: Overall map of Miami-Dade County and Closeup of Section 15 showing Perrine CDP

History of Miami-Dade County, Florida
Former census-designated places in Miami-Dade County, Florida
Former municipalities in Florida
Former census-designated places in Florida